Divisive is the eighth studio album by American heavy metal band Disturbed. Produced by Drew Fulk, it was released on November 18, 2022, via Reprise Records.

The first single from the album was "Hey You", which was released on July 14, 2022. In regards to the sound of the single, it is said to be similar to the band's earlier albums such as The Sickness and Ten Thousand Fists. A promotional single called "Unstoppable" was released on September 23, 2022, along with the details for their upcoming album.

Background and recording 
As early as October 2020, frontman David Draiman stated that he wanted new Disturbed music to be "blisteringly angry", considering everything going on in the world with the COVID-19 pandemic.

Back in April 2022, Draiman took to his Instagram page to a share a photo of a whiteboard to his fans and followers suggesting that the album has been completed, in that photo, which has now been deleted, a list of approximately ten songs can be seen, all marked with an "X" symbol, which had initially led to speculation by fans that the album is a covers album.

Ann Wilson of Heart appears on the album on the song titled "Don't Tell Me".   According to Dan Donegan, Ann is David's favorite female hard rock singer.   After Ann sent out a tweet saying she was "inspired" by the band's cover of "The Sound of Silence", David reached out to Ann to thank her and they developed an online friendship.   After the demo of "Don't Tell Me" had been recorded the band felt like it needed a female voice, and they thought Ann would be perfect.   David reached out to her to ask if she would appear on the record, and the band was delighted when she said yes.  In many interviews band members have stated they are "humbled" to have such rock royalty appear on the album.

"Hey You" topped the Mainstream Rock Airplay chart. A song titled "Bad Man" began radio play on Octane by November 15, and the song's meaning was inspired by the Russian invasion of Ukraine.

Reception

Divisive received mixed reviews from critics. In a review published on Wall of Sound, reviewer Ricky Aarons wrote: "Overall, Disturbed's new album is a pretty good record. Is it great? That decision may be divisive." He went on to praise the heavier approach on the album.

Another review came from Kris Peters from Heavy Magazine: "Yes, Disturbed will always to continue to do what they want musically, but don't ever think that means they are going soft. A welcome, if not completely triumphant, return!"

Joe Daly of Metal Hammer gave the album a rating of 4 out of 5 stars in a review published on Louder Sound. He said, "Polarising or not, Disturbed have reasserted their claim to the modern metal throne and Divisive will surely delight their existing fans, while picking up a few more along the way."

Blabbermouth.net gave the album a rating of 8.5/10.

Track listing 
All songs written by Disturbed, except where noted.

Personnel 
Disturbed
David Draiman – lead vocals
Dan Donegan – guitars, keyboards, background vocals
Mike Wengren – drums, percussion, background vocals
John Moyer – bass, background vocals

Additional musicians
Ann Wilson – vocals (on track 7)

Additional personnel
Drew Fulk – production, mixing, engineering
Ted Jensen – mastering
Jeff Dunne – mixing
Trent Woodman – mixing and engineering assistance
Jace Mann – additional engineering (on track 7)
Paul Murphy – additional engineering (on track 7)

Charts

References 

2022 albums
Disturbed (band) albums
Reprise Records albums